Funkhouser is an unincorporated community in Bartow County, in the U.S. state of Georgia.

History
The community took its name from the Funkhouser Company, a tile manufacturer.

References

Unincorporated communities in Bartow County, Georgia
Unincorporated communities in Georgia (U.S. state)